Zuidwoldepad is a RandstadRail station in The Hague, Netherlands. It is a stop for line 4.

RandstadRail services
The following services currently call at Zuidwoldepad:

Gallery

RandstadRail stations in The Hague